Mankumari Basu (25 January, 1863 - 26 December 1943) a popular Bengali poet and short story writer.

Works
Kusumanjali (With The Floral bucket) (1893) 
Kanakanjali (With The Golden bucket) (1896)
Priyaprasanga (About My Beloved) (1884)
Harano Pranay (The Lost Love) (1884)

References

External links
 

1863 births
1943 deaths
Bengali female poets
Bengali Hindus